Alfred Newman (1900–1970) was an American composer.

Alfred Newman may also refer to:

Alfred Newman (judge) (1834–1898), American judge
Alfred Newman (politician) (1849–1924), New Zealand politician
Alfred Alvarez Newman (1851–1887), English metalworker and art collector
Alfred Newman (architect) (1875–1921), Australian architect
Alfred Newman (Royal Navy officer) (1888–1984), awarded the Albert Medal in World War I
Alfred K. Newman (1924–2019), United States Navajo Code-talker
Alfred Newman (cyclist) (1926–1990), English cyclist

See also
Al Newman (Albert Newman, born 1960), American baseball player
Alfred E. Neuman, fictional mascot of Mad magazine
Alfred Neumann (disambiguation)